This article lists elections for legislative or quasi-legislative bodies in South Africa.

Parliamentary general elections

House of Assembly (1910–1984)
 15 September 1910
 20 October 1915
 20 March 1920
 8 February 1921
 19 June 1924
 14 June 1929
 17 May 1933
 18 May 1938
 17 July 1943
 26 May 1948
 15 April 1953
 16 April 1958
 8 October 1961
 30 March 1966
 22 April 1970
 24 April 1974
 30 November 1977
 29 April 1981

Tricameral Parliament (1984–1994)
 22 and 28 August 1984 (House of Representatives and House of Delegates)
 6 May 1987 (House of Assembly)
 6 September 1989 (all houses)

National Assembly (1994–present)
 26–29 April 1994
 2 June 1999
 14 April 2004
 22 April 2009
 7 May 2014
 8 May 2019

Referendums
 Natal Union referendum, 10 June 1909
 Republic referendum, 5 October 1960
 Constitutional reform referendum, 2 November 1983
 Negotiated reform referendum, 17 March 1992

Municipal elections
 1 November 1995 (delayed to 29 May 1996 in the Western Cape and 26 June 1996 in KwaZulu-Natal)
 5 December 2000
 1 March 2006
 18 May 2011
 3 August 2016
 1 November 2021

Bantustan elections

Transkei
 20 November 1963
 23 October 1968
 24 October 1973
 29 September 1976
 24 September 1981
 September 1986

Bophuthatswana
 4 October 1972
 22–24 August 1977
 October 1982
 27 October 1987

Venda
 15–16 August 1973
 5–6 July 1978
 July 1984

Ciskei
 19–23 February 1973
 18–22 June 1978
 Independence referendum, 4 December 1980
 September 1986

Gazankulu
 16–17 October 1973
 13 September 1978
 7 September 1983
 25 January 1989

KwaNdebele
 8–10 December 1988

Lebowa
 11 April 1973
 15 March 1978
 16 March 1983

QwaQwa
 19–21 March 1975
 19–21 April 1980
 1985
 1990

Representative council elections

Coloured Persons Representative Council
 30 September 1969
 19 March 1975

South African Indian Council
 4 November 1981

 
South Africa
Elections
Elections